Water jet may refer to:
 A jet of water under pressure, like in an ornamental fountain
 Pump-jet, a marine propulsion mechanism for jetskis and other types of boats
 Water jet cutter, a tool for cutting and the machining of engineering materials
 Water jet (recreation), a personal-use water cannon that can be turned to spray in different directions and is usually found in water parks
 Water-jet printer, a printer that makes use of water instead of ink
 Dental water jet, see Oral irrigator